John Edward Robinson (born December 27, 1943) is an American serial killer, con man, embezzler, kidnapper, and forger who was found guilty in 2003 for three murders committed in and around Kansas City, receiving the death penalty for two of them. In 2005, he admitted responsibility for five homicides in Missouri as part of a plea bargain to receive multiple life sentences without possibility of parole and avoid more death sentences. Investigators suspect that more victims remain undiscovered.

Because he made contact with most of his post-1993 victims via online chatrooms, Robinson is sometimes referred to as "the Internet's first serial killer".

Early life
John Robinson was born in Cicero, Illinois, the third of five children of an alcoholic father and a disciplinarian mother. In 1957, Robinson became an Eagle Scout and traveled to London with a group of Scouts who performed before Queen Elizabeth II. He enrolled at Quigley Preparatory Seminary in Chicago, a private boys school for aspiring priests, but dropped out after one year due to disciplinary issues.

In 1961, Robinson enrolled at Morton Junior College in Cicero to become a medical radiographer, but dropped out after two years. In 1964, he moved to Kansas City and married Nancy Jo Lynch, who gave birth to their first child, John Jr., in 1965, followed by daughter Kimberly in 1967, and twins Christopher and Christine in 1971.

Early crimes
In 1969, Robinson was arrested in Kansas City for embezzling $33,000 from the medical practice of Dr. Wallace Graham, where he worked as a radiographer using forged credentials. He was sentenced to three years' probation. The following year, he violated probation by moving to Chicago without his probation officer's permission and gained a job as an insurance salesman at the R.B. Jones Company. In 1971, he was arrested for embezzling funds and was ordered back to Kansas City, where his probation was extended. In 1975, Robinson's probation was extended again after an arrest on charges of securities fraud and mail fraud in connection with a phony medical consulting company he had formed.

Robinson became a Scoutmaster, a baseball coach, and a Sunday school teacher. In 1977, he was named to the board of directors of a local charitable organization where he forged letters from its executive director to the mayor of Kansas City and from the mayor to civic leaders, naming him as the organization's Man of the Year. Under that guise, he hosted an awards luncheon in his honor.

After completing his probation in 1979, Robinson was arrested for embezzlement and check forgery, for which he served sixty days in jail in 1982. After his release, he formed a bogus hydroponics business and stole $25,000 from a friend to whom he promised a fast investment return so the friend could pay for his dying wife's medical care.

Murders
In 1984, having established two more fraudulent shell companies, Robinson hired Paula Godfrey, aged 19, ostensibly to work as a sales representative. Godfrey told friends and family that Robinson was sending her away for training. After hearing nothing further from her, Godfrey's parents filed a missing persons report. Police questioned Robinson, who denied any knowledge of her whereabouts. Several days later, her parents received a typewritten letter, with Godfrey's signature at the bottom, thanking Robinson for his help and asserting that she was "OK" and did not want to see her family. The investigation was terminated as Godfrey was of legal age, and there was no evidence of wrongdoing. No trace of Godfrey has ever been found.

In 1985, using the name John Osborne, Robinson met Lisa Stasi and her four-month-old daughter, Tiffany, at a women's shelter in Kansas City. He promised Stasi a job and a stable living situation in Chicago in exchange for signing several sheets of blank stationery. A few days later, Robinson contacted his brother Don and sister-in-law, Helen, who had been unable to adopt a baby through traditional channels, informing them that he knew of a baby whose mother had killed herself. For $5,500 in "legal fees", the couple received Tiffany (whose identity was confirmed by DNA testing in 2000) and a set of authentic-appearing adoption papers with the forged signatures of two lawyers and a judge. Stasi was never heard from again.

In 1987, Catherine Clampitt, aged 27, left her child with her parents in Wichita Falls, Texas, and moved to Kansas City to find employment. Robinson hired her, reportedly with the promise of extensive travel and a new wardrobe. She vanished in June of that year. Her missing persons' case remains open.

Between 1987 to 1993, Robinson was incarcerated, first in Kansas (1987–1991) on multiple fraud convictions and later in Missouri for another fraud conviction and parole violations. At the Western Missouri Correctional Facility, he met 49-year-old Beverly Bonner, the prison librarian. Upon his release, Bonner left her husband, a prison doctor, and moved to Kansas to work for him. After Robinson arranged for Bonner's alimony checks to be forwarded to a Kansas post office box, her family never heard from her again. For several years, Bonner's mother continued forwarding her alimony checks and Robinson continued cashing them.

By then, Robinson had discovered the Internet and roamed online chatrooms using the name "Slavemaster," looking for women who enjoyed playing the submissive partner role during sex. An early online correspondent was Sheila Faith, aged 45, whose 15-year-old daughter Debbie was a wheelchair user due to spina bifida. Robinson, portraying himself as a wealthy businessman and philanthropist, offered to pay Debbie's medical expenses and give Sheila a job. In 1994, the mother and daughter moved from Fullerton, California, to Kansas City and immediately disappeared. Robinson cashed Faith's pension checks for the next seven years.

Robinson became well known in increasingly popular BDSM chatrooms. In 1999, he offered a job and a bondage relationship to Izabela Lewicka, a 21-year-old Polish immigrant living in Indiana. When she moved to Kansas City, Robinson (who was still married) gave Lewicka an engagement ring and brought her to the county registrar, where they paid for a marriage license that was never picked up. It is unclear whether Lewicka believed she and Robinson were married; she told her parents she had married but never told them her husband's name. She did sign a 115-item slave contract that gave Robinson almost total control over every aspect of her life, including her bank accounts. Sometime during the summer of 1999, Lewicka disappeared. Robinson told a web designer he employed that she had been caught smoking marijuana and deported.

Around the time of Lewicka's disappearance, a licensed practical nurse named Suzette Trouten moved from Michigan to Kansas to travel the world with Robinson as his submissive sex slave. Trouten's mother received several typed letters signed by her daughter and purportedly mailed while the couple was abroad, although the envelopes all bore Kansas City postmarks. The letters were, her mother said, uncharacteristically free of typographical errors. Later, Robinson told Trouten's mother that she had run off with an acquaintance after stealing money from him.

Arrest
Over time, Robinson became increasingly careless, and his ability to avoid detection declined. By 1999, he had attracted the attention of authorities in Kansas and Missouri as his name frequently came up in missing person investigations. He was arrested in June 2000 at his farm near La Cygne, Kansas, after a woman filed a sexual battery complaint against him and another charged him with stealing her sex toys. The theft charge finally gave investigators the probable cause they needed to obtain search warrants. On the farm, a task force found the decaying bodies of two women, later identified as Lewicka and Trouten, in two  chemical drums.

Across the state line in Missouri, investigators searched a storage facility where Robinson rented two garages. They found three similar chemical drums containing corpses subsequently identified as Bonner, Faith, and Faith's daughter. All five women were killed in the same way, by one or more blows to the head with a blunt instrument.

Conviction
In 2002, Robinson stood trial in Kansas for the murders of Trouten, Lewicka, and Stasi along with multiple lesser charges. After the longest criminal trial in Kansas history, he was convicted on all counts. Robinson received the death penalty for the murders of Trouten and Lewicka, and life imprisonment for Stasi's murder because she was killed before Kansas reinstated the death penalty. He received a 5-to-20-year prison sentence for interfering with the parental custody of Stasi's baby, 20.5 years for kidnapping Trouten, and seven months for theft.

After his Kansas convictions, Robinson faced murder charges in Missouri based on the evidence discovered in that state. Missouri aggressively pursued capital punishment convictions, so Robinson's attorneys wanted to avoid a trial there. Chris Koster, the Missouri prosecutor, insisted as a condition of any plea bargain that Robinson lead authorities to the bodies of Stasi, Godfrey, and Clampitt. Robinson, who has never cooperated with investigators, refused. However, Koster faced pressure to make a deal because his case was not technically airtight⁠. Among other issues, there was no unequivocal evidence that any of the murders had been committed within his jurisdiction. Robinson, on the other hand, faced pressure to plead guilty to avoid an almost certain death sentence in Missouri, and failing that, yet another capital murder trial back in Kansas.

When it became clear that the women's remains would never be found without Robinson's cooperation, a compromise was reached. In a carefully scripted plea in October 2003, Robinson acknowledged that Koster had enough evidence to convict him of capital murder for the deaths of Godfrey, Clampitt, Bonner, and the Faiths. Though his statement was technically a guilty plea and was accepted as such by the Missouri court, observers remarked that it was notably devoid of any remorse or specific acceptance of responsibility. Robinson received a life sentence without possibility of parole for each of the five murders.

In November 2015, the Kansas Supreme Court vacated the Trouten and Stasi murder convictions on technicalities, but upheld the Lewicka conviction and its accompanying death sentence. The ruling marked the first time Kansas's highest court has upheld a death sentence since the reinstatement of capital punishment there in 1994. Robinson currently remains on death row at the El Dorado Correctional Facility in Kansas.

Aftermath
In 2005, Nancy Robinson filed for divorce after forty-one years of marriage, citing incompatibility and irreconcilable differences. The following year, Stasi's daughter—known since her (faked) adoption as Heather Robinson—filed a civil suit against Truman Medical Center in Kansas City and social worker Karen Gaddis. The suit accused Gaddis of putting Robinson in contact with Stasi and her newborn daughter in 1984 after he told Gaddis that he ran a charitable organization assisting "unwed mothers of white babies." In 2007, Heather and the hospital reached a settlement for an undisclosed sum, which Heather said she would split with her biological grandmother, Patricia Sylvester. Heather won a second judgment in 2007 preventing Robinson from profiting from any future potential book sales or film rights.

In 2006, the body of a young woman was found in a barrel in an area of rural Iowa where Robinson reportedly had a business partner. She was initially considered a possible victim but was later identified as Lois Tomich, who police believe was killed by her ex-husband.

Kansas and Missouri police note that long stretches of Robinson's time remain unaccounted for, and fear that there are additional undiscovered victims. "He's maintained the secrets about what he's done with the women. He won't ever tell. It's the last control he's got," said one investigator. "There are [probably] other barrels waiting to be opened, other bodies waiting to be found."

Victims 
Robinson is known to be responsible for eight homicides, but his total victim tally remains unknown. The following is a chronological summary of the victims identified thus far:

 1984: Paula Godfrey (age 19); remains never recovered
 1985: Lisa Stasi (age 19); remains never recovered
 1987: Catherine Clampitt (age 27); remains never recovered
 1993: Beverly Bonner (age 49): remains discovered at storage facility in Raymore, Missouri 
 1994: Sheila Faith (age 45) and Debbie Faith (15): remains of both discovered at storage facility in Raymore, Missouri 
 1999: Izabela Lewicka (age 21): remains discovered at Robinson's ranch near La Cygne, Kansas
 2000: Suzette Trouten (age 28): remains discovered at Robinson's ranch near La Cygne, Kansas

In media
 A 2001 book by John Glatt, Internet Slave Master, documented Robinson's life up to the time of his Kansas trial. A second book by Glatt, Depraved, published in 2005, focused on the lives of Robinson's victims and others affected by his crimes. 
 Anyone You Want Me to Be: A True Story of Sex and Death on the Internet by John Douglas and Stephen Singular was published in 2003.
 Sue Wiltz' book Slave Master was published in 2004.

Robinson's criminal activities were also profiled on episodes of the A&E series Cold Case Files, Investigation Discovery's FBI: Criminal Pursuit, Sins & Secrets, Vanity Fair Confidential, It Takes a Killer, and Deadly Doctors, as well as Forensic Files, and The New Detectives on the Discovery Channel.

See also
 Internet killer
 John Haigh

General:
 List of serial killers in the United States

References
 Slave Master (Pinnacle True Crime) by Sue Wiltz and Maurice Godwin. Kensington Books

External links
 Kansas Prison Inmate Database - Kansas Department of Corrections
 Robinson, John E Sr (KDOC# 45690) - current status is incarcerated
 Complete Court TV coverage of "slave master" serial killer John Robinson
 Snopes addresses Slavemaster rumours

1943 births
American confidence tricksters
American people convicted of fraud
American people convicted of murder
American people convicted of theft
American prisoners sentenced to death
American serial killers
Forgers
Living people
Male serial killers
Murder convictions without a body
People convicted of murder by Kansas
People convicted of murder by Missouri
People from Cicero, Illinois
People from La Cygne, Kansas
Prisoners sentenced to death by Kansas